White Swan Public House (WSPH) is a seafood restaurant in Seattle, in the U.S. state of Washington.

Description 
The Seattle Metropolitan describes WSPH as an American/New American gastropub which "combines one of the city’s epic waterside patios with some of the best elements of its restaurant group peers, treating seafood with the same humorous verve Radiator Whiskey applies to meat. Service can get overwhelmed on sunny days, but show me another place where you can chase beautiful raw oysters with chowder-inspired poutine." The menu has included fish, clams, oysters, and scallops, as well as fried maitake mushrooms, oven-roasted octopus, fried Brussels sprouts, and bone marrow on toast.

History 
The restaurant is owned by Dan Bugge, who also owns Matt's in the Market and Radiator Whiskey.

Reception 
Megan Hill, Gabe Guarente, and Jade Yamazaki Stewart included WSPH in Eater Seattle 2022 overview of "Where to Get Outstanding Oysters in Seattle". Writers for the website also included the restaurant in a 2022 list of "15 Lively Seattle Restaurants for Big Group Dinners".

See also 

 List of New American restaurants
 List of seafood restaurants

References

External links 

 

Gastropubs in the United States
New American restaurants in Seattle
Seafood restaurants in Seattle